Gymnodactylus darwinii is a species of lizard in the family Phyllodactylidae. The species is endemic to Brazil.

Etymology
The specific name, darwinii, is in honor of English naturalist Charles Darwin.

Geographic range
G. darwinii is found in eastern Brazil.

Habitat
The preferred natural habitats of G. darwinii are forest and shrubland.

Description

Diet
G. darwinii preys upon isopods, orthopterans, and other small arthropods.

Reproduction
G. darwinii is oviparous. Communal nesting has been observed.

References

Further reading
Freire EMX (1998). "Diferençião geografica em Gymnodactylus darwinii (Gray, 1845) (Sauria, Gekkonidae)". Papéis Avulsos de Zoologia, Museu de Zoologia da Universidade de São Paulo 40 (20): 311–322. (in Portuguese).
Gray JE (1845). Catalogue of the Specimens of Lizards in the Collection of the British Museum. London: Trustees of the British Museum. (Edward Newman, printer). xxviii + 289 pp. (Cubinia darwinii, new species, p. 274).

Gymnodactylus
Reptiles of Brazil
Endemic fauna of Brazil
Reptiles described in 1845
Taxa named by John Edward Gray